Çay railway station is a railway station in Çay, Turkey. TCDD Taşımacılık operates a daily inter-city train from İzmir to Konya which stops at the station at night.

Çay station was built in 1896 by the Ottoman Anatolian Railway.

References

External links
TCDD Taşımacılık
Turkish State Railways
Turkish train timetables

Railway stations in Afyonkarahisar Province
Railway stations opened in 1896